Ambonus distinctus is a species of beetle in the family Cerambycidae. It was described by Newman in 1840.

References

Elaphidiini
Beetles described in 1840